Getting Our Thing Together is a 1968 album by organist Brother Jack McDuff which was his second release on the Cadet label.

Track listing 
All compositions by Jack McDuff except as indicated
 "Win, Lose Or Draw" (Harold Ousley) - 3:00 (Arranged by Richard Evans)  
 "Black Is!" - 2:54  (Arranged by Brother Jack McDuff) 
 "Jelly Jam" (Larry Tassi, Bob Sedita, Mike Sagarese, Greg Geddes) - 4:00 (Arranged by Richard Evans)   
 "The Pulpit" - 5:49 (Arranged by Brother Jack McDuff)
 "You Sho' Walk Funky" (Richard Evans) - 3:30 (Arranged by Richard Evans)   
 "Hold It for a Minute" - 4:30   (Arranged by Brother Jack McDuff)
 "Summertime" (George Gershwin, DuBose Heyward) - 4:08  (Arranged by Brother Jack McDuff)  
 "Up, Up and Away" (Jimmy Webb) - 4:27 (Arranged by Brother Jack McDuff)   
 "Two Lines" - 4:40 (Arranged by Brother Jack McDuff)

Personnel 
Brother Jack McDuff - organ, arranger
Unidentified Big band arranged and conducted by Richard Evans

Other Credits
Lew Futterman - Producer
 Richard Evans - Production Supervisor
Jerry Griffith - Album Design
Nancy Reiner - Cover Art
Stu Black - Engineer
Bill Ardis - Liner Notes

References 

Jack McDuff albums
1968 albums
Cadet Records albums